The First National Bank and Masonic Lodge is a historic building located in Fairfax, Oklahoma.  The bank portion of the building was built in 1906.  The lodge meeting hall portion was added by Greyhorse Lodge No. 124 in 1924.  It was listed on the National Register of Historic Places in 1984.  It is regarded as the best example of Georgian Revival architecture in Osage County.

References

Bank buildings on the National Register of Historic Places in Oklahoma
Buildings and structures in Osage County, Oklahoma
Clubhouses on the National Register of Historic Places in Oklahoma
Colonial Revival architecture in Oklahoma
Commercial buildings completed in 1906
Masonic buildings completed in 1924
Masonic buildings in Oklahoma
National Register of Historic Places in Osage County, Oklahoma
1906 establishments in Oklahoma Territory